Ayeyarwady Region Hluttaw is the legislature of the Burmese region of Ayeyarwady Region. It is a unicameral body, consisting of 72 members, including 54 elected members and 18 military representatives. As of February 2016, the Hluttaw was led by speaker Aung Kyaw Khaing of the National League for Democracy (NLD).

As of the 2015 general election, the National League for Democracy (NLD) won the most contested seats in the legislature, based on the most recent election results.

General Election results (Nov. 2015)

See also
State and Region Hluttaws
Pyidaungsu Hluttaw

References

Unicameral legislatures
Ayeyarwady Region
Legislatures of Burmese states and regions